The 1966 Jacksonville State Gamecocks football team represented Jacksonville State College (now known as Jacksonville State University) as a member of the Alabama Collegiate Conference (ACC) during the 1966 NAIA football season. Led by second-year head coach Jim Blevins, the Gamecocks compiled an overall record of 8–2 with a mark of 3–0 in conference play, and finished as ACC champion.

Schedule

References

Jacksonville State
Jacksonville State Gamecocks football seasons
Alabama Collegiate Conference football champion seasons
Jacksonville State Gamecocks football